Szerdahely may refer to:

 Szerdahely, the Hungarian name of Miercurea Sibiului in Romania
 Dunaszerdahely, the Hungarian name of Dunajská Streda in western Slovakia
 Szerdahely or Bodrogszerdahely, the names of Streda nad Bodrogom in eastern Slovakia
 Szerdahely, a former village, merged in 1898 into the village of Fertőszentmiklós